Morgan-Gold House, also known as "Golden Meadows" or the Samuel Gold House, is a historic home located at Bunker Hill, Berkeley County, West Virginia. It is an "L" shaped, three bay, two-story, log dwelling on a stone foundation. The front section was built about 1809, and is a 20 1/2-feet deep and 30 1/2-feet wide block, with a pedimented portico in the Greek Revival style.  The rear part of the ell was built about 1745 by David Morgan, son of the Morgan Morgan the first white settler of West Virginia. Also on the property are three log outbuildings and Victorian-era granary.

It was listed on the National Register of Historic Places in 1985.

See also
 William G. Morgan House

References

Greek Revival houses in West Virginia
Houses completed in 1745
Houses completed in 1809
Houses in Berkeley County, West Virginia
Houses on the National Register of Historic Places in West Virginia
Morgan family of West Virginia
National Register of Historic Places in Berkeley County, West Virginia
Log buildings and structures on the National Register of Historic Places in West Virginia
1745 establishments in Virginia